The  was the 2021 (Reiwa 3) edition of NHK's television special Kōhaku Uta Gassen, held on December 31, 2021, live from the hall A of Tokyo International Forum (Tokyo, Japan), and broadcast in Japan through NHK General Television and NHK Radio 1, and worldwide through TV Japan (US only) and NHK World Premium. Yo Oizumi, Haruna Kawaguchi & Mayuko Wakuda served as show hosts. The Red team won this event.

About the show
This year's edition took place on Tokyo International Forum, since the usual venue, NHK Hall is currently undergoing renovations, to be done in time for the 73rd edition (2022). Starting this year, there will be no longer separate hosts for the Red and White team. Instead, the hosts will share duties with the general host, encouraging the performers, regardless of their gender. The theme for the 72nd edition is "Colorful", based on an idea of "I want to make the world as colorful as possible on the last night of 2021". The new logo for the show is also introduced: it is a gradient image that goes from red to white.

This was the first edition in two years to be held with an audience, with a certain number of spectators. After 50 appearances (the last being in 2020), Hiroshi Itsuki announced that he will not participate in this Kouhaku during a concert held on October 17.

Once again, Shunichi Tokura conducted the choir in the closing song "Hotaru no Hikari".

On December 25, Seiko Matsuda, who was scheduled to participate in the event, announced that she would withdraw from the event due to the sudden death of her daughter Sayaka Kanda.

On December 27, the performance order was revealed. LiSA and Hiromi Go will open the show, while Masaharu Fukuyama and MISIA (who makes her second consecutive Ootori) will repeat their closing acts from last year. Rehearsals took place from December 28 until the morning of the live show.

Artist lineup
   

SONGS PERFORMED ON MEDLEYS
 Tomoyasu Hotei: "Battle Without Honor or Humanity", "Sayonara Seishun no Hikari"
 MISIA: "Ashita e", "Higher Love"

ADDITIONAL MUSIC
 "Ode to Joy" - Composed by Ludwig Van Beethoven
 "Next Episode" - Shiro Sagisu (from Neon Genesis Evangelion OST)
 "I Can't Help Falling in Love" - Performed by Hi-STANDARD (Original by Elvis Presley)
 "You've Got a Friend" - Performed by Carole King

Guest Performers
 Midories
 Ryunosuke Kamiki - Aoi voice actor
 Fumi Nikaido - Ki voice actress
 Tokyo Metropolitan Symphony Orchestra - Dragon Quest music performers
 Takayuki Yamada - Dragon Quest VTR narrator
 Natsuki Hanae - Tanjiro Kamado voice actor
 Megumi Ogata - Shinji Ikari voice actress
 Megumi Hayashibara - Rei Ayanami voice actress
 Yuko Miyamura - Asuka Langley voice actress
 Kotono Mitsuishi - Misato Katsuragi voice actress
 Fumihiko Tachiki - Gendou Ikari voice actor
 Yoko Takahashi - Performer on "A Cruel Angel's Thesis"
 Kendama Chiba-chan, Kendama Heroes 2021, Taiyu Shoinji, Zuu Mandrake, DJ KOO, Fuku Suzuki, Mook - Kendama players on Hiroshi Miyama's performance
 Azuma - Flower artist on Yuzu's performance
 Fuu Hanataka - Hiroshi Miyama VTR narrator
 Kreva, Miyavi - Guest performers on Sayuri Ishikawa's performance
 Osaka Toin High School Symphonic Band - Guest musicians on Yoshimi Tendo's performance
 Nobuyoshi Kuwano, Yoshio Sato - Members from Rats & Star, guest vocalists on Masayuki Suzuki's performance
 Hayato Sumino - Piano on Mone Kamishiraishi's performance
 Hitori Gekidan - Reprising his role as a control booth technician from the 2020 Summer Olympics opening ceremony

Voting System
This year, the 3-Point System was used again. One point is given from the six judges, another one from audience in TIF, and last one from the viewers. The team with at least 2 points is declared winner of the 72nd edition.

References 

NHK Kōhaku Uta Gassen events
2021 in Japanese music
2021 in Japanese television